Thermal Power Plant 27 Severnaya is a combined heat and power plant located in the village of Chelobityevo in Mytishchinsky District of Moscow Oblast, Russia. It is owned and operated by Mosenergo. It provides heat and power to Mytishchi, as well as to Northern and North-Eastern Administrative Okrugs of Moscow.

The decision to build the power plant was taken in 1980s. However, due to opposition of the local population the construction was postponed. The first unit became operational in 1996 and the second unit in 1998. The third unit was added in 2007 and the fourth unit in 2008.

2019 incident
On July 11th, 2019, a major fire broke out at the power station.  According to eyewitnesses and video footage, the fire was caused by an explosion, and the flames were said to be close to 50 meters tall.

References

External links

 Thermal Power Plant 27 at the Mosenergo Official Site (archive)

Energy infrastructure completed in 1992
Energy infrastructure completed in 2007
Natural gas-fired power stations in Russia
Cogeneration power stations in Russia
Mytishchinsky District